Arwa Damon (born September 19, 1977) is an American journalist who was most recently a senior international correspondent for  CNN, based in Istanbul. From 2003, she covered the Middle East as a freelance journalist, before joining CNN in 2006. She is also president and founder of INARA, a humanitarian organization that provides medical treatment to refugee children from Syria.

Early life and education 
Born in Boston, to an American father and Syrian mother, Damon spent her early childhood years in Wayland, Massachusetts. Damon is the granddaughter of Muhsin al-Barazi, the former Syrian Kurd Prime Minister of Syria, who was executed in the August 1949 Syrian coup d'état.

At the age of six, Damon and her family moved to Morocco, followed by Istanbul, Turkey three years later, where her father was a teacher and middle school director at Robert College. He went from there to Işıkkent School in Izmir, and was then headmaster of the American Community School at Beirut from 2003 until his retirement in 2013.

Damon skipped sixth grade and graduated with honors from Robert College at the age of 16. She then spent a gap year with her aunt and uncle in Morocco, learning show jumping, before moving to the U.S. to attend Skidmore College in Saratoga Springs, New York. She graduated with honors in 1999 with a double major in French and biology and a minor in international affairs. She is fluent in Arabic, French, Turkish, and English, having grown up speaking all four languages.

Before becoming a reporter, Damon worked for a New York–based Turkish textile company.

Career

CameraPlanet 
Damon decided to become a journalist after 9/11, and moved to Baghdad prior to the beginning of the Iraq War. She began her career at CameraPlanet, a supplier of media content for television newscasts, working to get correspondent Peter Arnett's team into pre-war Iraq. For three years, she covered the Middle East as a freelance producer working with CNN, CNN International, PBS, Fox News and others, before joining CNN in February 2006.

CNN/CNN International 
Damon also covered the Iraqi elections of January 2005, the constitutional referendum vote in October 2005, and the Iraqi election of December 2005. She also reported on the trials and executions of Saddam Hussein, Barzan Ibrahim Hassan al-Tikriti and Awad Hamed al-Bandar in January 2007.

During the Syrian civil war, Damon travelled multiple times to Syria and to refugee camps for Syrians. After the 2012 Benghazi attack, she was one of the first journalists to arrive at the scene; she recovered slain Ambassador J. Christopher Stevens' personal diary.

In 2013, Damon followed an anti-poaching park ranger unit through Odzala National Park in the Republic of the Congo. The feature was called Arwa Damon Investigates: Ivory War.

In April 2014, after the Chibok schoolgirls kidnapping, she travelled to West Africa and the islands of Lake Chad to follow the hunt for the terrorists.

Damon covered the International military intervention against ISIL on numerous occasions, dating to the beginning of the conflict.

Damon returned to Iraq in the second half of 2016 and covered the Battle of Mosul. Riding with a convoy consisting of press and Iraqi soldiers, she came under heavy fire by IS troops and was trapped. After 28 hours of entrenched fighting, reinforcements from the Iraqi military rescued them.

Damon travelled to Thailand to cover the Tham Luang cave rescue.

Damon often shows interest in reporting on nature, environmental protection and similar themes. In 2018 she accompanied a Greenpeace group to Antarctica and made a feature of it.

In 2019 Damon travelled to Kathmandu in Nepal to report on a spike in fatalities amongst Mount Everest climbers.

2019 she traveled again with Greenpeace, this time to the Arctic. She reported about the significant loss of ice at the poles and their importance for the whole ecosystem of the earth.

She announced her departure from CNN in June 2022, after an 18 year reporting career with the network.

INARA 
INARA (the International Network for Aid, Relief and Assistance) is a humanitarian aid, 501(c)3, non-profit organization that was co-founded by Arwa Damon in 2015 in Beirut, Lebanon.  INARA provides medical services for children who have been wounded in war zones.  It also provides rehabilitation treatment for its beneficiaries.

The organization focuses on refugee children from Syria. As of August 2018, INARA has managed to provide treatment to over 150 refugee children.

Awards and honors 
Damon won an Investigative Reporters and Editors' IRE Award for her reporting of the Consulate attack in Benghazi, along with fellow photojournalist Sarmad Qaseera.

Damon was part of the CNN team who won the 2012 Emmy Award for Outstanding Live Coverage of a Current News Story – Long Form (Revolution in Egypt:  President Mubarak Steps Down). In 2014, she was awarded the Courage in Journalism Award given by the International Women's Media Foundation (IWMF).

Legal history 
Damon and CNN were sued by two employees of the U.S. Embassy in Baghdad claiming that on July 19, 2014, an intoxicated Damon bit them. Damon acknowledged the incident and apologized.

References

External links 

 Profile at CNN
 
 Arwa Damon talks in a video on her motivation to cover the Syrian conflict.
 An article in the Women's Wear Daily magazine.
 Half hour feature video, in which Damon accompany's a Greenpeace crew with their ship to the Antarctic.
 An article at the CNN website about her trip to the Arctic in 2019.

1977 births
Living people
21st-century American journalists
21st-century American women writers
American expatriates in Lebanon
American expatriates in Morocco
American expatriates in Turkey
American people of Kurdish descent
American people of Syrian descent
American television reporters and correspondents
American women journalists
American women war correspondents
CNN people
Humanitarian aid organizations
Journalists from Massachusetts
News & Documentary Emmy Award winners
People from Wayland, Massachusetts
Robert College alumni
Skidmore College alumni
War correspondents of the Iraq War
Women in the Iraq War
Writers from Boston